Vincenzo Traspedini (born 27 December 1939 in Montodine; died 14 April 2003 in Verona) was an Italian professional footballer who played as a forward.

References 

1939 births
2003 deaths
Italian footballers
Serie A players
Serie B players
Torino F.C. players
A.C. Monza players
S.S.D. Varese Calcio players
Juventus F.C. players
Calcio Foggia 1920 players
Hellas Verona F.C. players
Atalanta B.C. players
Genoa C.F.C. players
Association football forwards
A.S.D. Fanfulla players